The Nagler NH-160 was an experimental single seat helicopter with counter-rotating blades.

Design and development
Bruno Nagler began wind tunnel experiments into helicopter design in 1926 and developed the first practical swash plate.
The Nagler NH-120 was developed to test the idea of counteracting rotor torque with a small separate rotor. The engine was mounted above the main rotor on a shaft, and the anti-torque rotor was mounted above both. The NH-160 had a conventional helicopter engine and rotor layout, with the exception of the smaller anti-torque rotor mounted under the fuselage between the landing skids. Yaw control on both was effected through changing the difference in rotational speed between the two rotors, using a series of disc brakes. A small tail surface provided directional stability in forward flight. The smaller rotor would spin at a higher rpm, with about 60 percent of the load,. the main rotor being adjustable for lift control.

The NH-160 proved to be much more stable in tests than the NH-120 which had a higher center of gravity.

Variants
NH-120
Helicopter with engine mounted above rotor with a counter-torque rotor mounted above the engine.
NH-170
An enclosed two-seat side-by-side design with a shrouded lower counter-torque rotor.

Specifications (Nagler NH-160)

See also

References

1950s United States helicopters
Single-engined piston helicopters